The Taming of Chance is a 1990 book about the history of probability by the philosopher Ian Hacking. First published by Cambridge University Press, it is a sequel to Hacking's The Emergence of Probability (1975). The book received positive reviews.

Summary

Hacking discusses the history of probability. He draws on the work of the philosopher Michel Foucault.

Publication history
The Taming of Chance was first published in the United Kingdom by Cambridge University Press in 1990. It is part of the series Ideas in Context.

Reception
The Taming of Chance has been described as ground-breaking. The book received positive reviews from the statistician Dennis Lindley in Nature, the philosopher Stephen P. Turner in the American Journal of Sociology, the historian of science Theodore M. Porter in American Scientist and in Poetics Today, and Timothy L. Alborn in  Isis. The book received mixed reviews from the philosopher Margaret Schabas in Science and Bruce Kuklick in American Historical Review.

Lindley credited Hacking with presenting a careful and entertaining discussion of the development of the idea of chance, successfully showing that the laws of chance developed from "collections of data." He noted that, "Hacking's argument is supported by a vast number of references to statistical work and the interpretations put upon it." However, he criticized Hacking's style for being sometimes "overwhelming in its complexity", and questioned whether Hacking's thesis was original. Turner wrote that the book was useful for both sociologists of science and historians of social science, and that while Hacking's arguments were open to objections, Hacking was "too sophisticated" to be caught by them. Porter wrote in American Scientist that Hacking made "outstanding use" of Foucault's insights. He believed that Hacking's perspective was "especially fitting as an approach to the history of probability and statistics." Although he was not entirely satisfied with Hacking's arguments, he concluded that the book was "eminently worth reading." In Poetics Today, Porter described the book as "exceptionally illuminating on the issue of statistics and control" and credited Hacking with suggesting a "suitably subtle way of understanding social statistics." Alborn wrote that Hacking had a "vibrant writing style" and presented a "wealth of material". However, he also wrote that the book left many questions unanswered.

Schabas complimented Hacking for his discussion of "the debate over free will and determinism." However, she wrote that because the book built on previous works by Hacking such as The Emergence of Probability, it "does not exhilarate quite as much." She disputed the novelty of parts of Hacking's argument, noting that Porter had dealt with much of the same subject matter in The Rise of Statistical Thinking (1986). Kuklick noted that the book was a sequel to Hacking's earlier work The Emergence of Probability. Kuklick praised Hacking for the "richness of his ideas" and credited him with mastering complicated literature in several languages and "meticulous scholarship" superior to that of Foucault. However, he considered the book a "strain to understand" and criticized Hacking for giving insufficient emphasis to the role of the hospital in "acclimating the public to chance and probability", and for his "penchant for irrelevant anecdotes" and poor judgment about how to write about the past.

References

Bibliography
Books

 
 

Journals

  
  
 
 
 
 
  

1990 non-fiction books
Books by Ian Hacking
Cambridge University Press books
Contemporary philosophical literature
English-language books
Philosophy of mathematics literature